Piz Lavirun (also known as Pizzo Leverone) is a mountain in the Livigno Range of the Alps, located on the border between Italy and Switzerland. It lies between the Val Lavirun (Graubünden) and the Valle di Federia (Lombardy).

References

External links
 Piz Lavirun on Hikr

Mountains of the Alps
Alpine three-thousanders
Mountains of Switzerland
Mountains of Italy
Italy–Switzerland border
International mountains of Europe
Mountains of Graubünden